Wolfe is an unincorporated community in Mercer County, West Virginia, United States. Wolfe had a post office, which closed on June 25, 2011.

References

External links

Unincorporated communities in Mercer County, West Virginia
Unincorporated communities in West Virginia
Coal towns in West Virginia